The Oberhermsdorfer Bach is a river of Saxony, Germany. It flows into the Wiederitz in Freital.

See also
List of rivers of Saxony

Rivers of Saxony
Rivers of Germany